The 2011 Kebbi State gubernatorial election occurred on April 26, 2011. PDP candidate Usman Saidu Nasamu Dakingari won the election, defeating CPC Abubakar Abubakar and 13 other candidates.

Usman Saidu Nasamu Dakingari emerged PDP's candidate in the primary election. He picked Ibrahim Aliyu as his running mate.

Abubakar Abubakar was CPC candidate, Kabiru Tanimu Turaki was ACN candidate.

Results
Usman Saidu Nasamu Dakingari from the PDP won the election defeating other 14 candidates.

The total number of registered voters in the state was 1,636,308, total votes cast was 1,020,899, valid votes was 965,101 and rejected votes was 55,798.

Usman Saidu Nasamu Dakingari, (PDP)- 559,424
Abubakar Abubakar, CPC- 555,769
Kabiru Tanimu Turaki, ACN- 67,710
Mohammed Nasiru Magaji, NTP- 2,849
Sulaiman Muhammad Argungu, ANPP- 1,801
Abubakar Umaru, PPA- 1,574
Umaru Birnin Kebbi, APGA- 1,217
Sani Abubakar, CPP- 1,168
Mohammed Nura, PPP- 552
Attari Sani, AD- 454
Lawan Moad, ALP- 428
Muhammed Danbare, LP- 378
Usman Garba, NSDP- 378
Sahabi Atiku, NNPP- 361
Hauwau Mohammed, ADC- 325

References 

Kebbi State gubernatorial elections
Kebbi State gubernatorial election
Kebbi State gubernatorial election